Olga Aleksandrovna Arkhangelskaya (born 20 March 1981), née Olga Golovanova, is a Russian badminton player.

Achievements

BWF Grand Prix 
The BWF Grand Prix has two levels: Grand Prix Gold and Grand Prix. It is a series of badminton tournaments, sanctioned by Badminton World Federation (BWF) since 2007.

Women's doubles

  BWF Grand Prix Gold tournament
  BWF Grand Prix tournament

BWF International Challenge/Series (11 titles, 16 runners-up) 
Women's singles

Women's doubles

  BWF International Challenge tournament
  BWF International Series tournament
  BWF Future Series tournament

References

External links 
 

1981 births
Living people
Badminton players from Moscow
Russian female badminton players
21st-century Russian women